Remetea Chioarului is a commune in Maramureș County, Romania. It is composed of five villages: Berchez (Magyarberkesz), Berchezoaia (Berkeszpataka), Posta (Pusztafentős), Remecioara (Kisremete) and Remetea Chioarului.

Chioar fortress is located near Berchezoaia village.

References

Communes in Maramureș County